The discography of American singer John Legend consists of eight full-length studio albums, five live albums, two video albums, three extended plays, 39 singles and two promotional singles.

Prior to the release of Legend's debut album, his career gained momentum through a series of successful collaborations with multiple established artists. He sang on Magnetic Man's "Getting Nowhere", Kanye West's "All of the Lights", Slum Village's "Selfish", and Dilated Peoples' "This Way". Other artists included Jay-Z's "Encore", and he sang backing vocals on Alicia Keys' 2003 song "You Don't Know My Name", the Kanye West remix of Britney Spears' "Me Against the Music", and Fort Minor's "High Road". Legend played piano on Lauryn Hill's "Everything Is Everything". He earned a Billboard Hot 100 number-one single with "All of Me". He has sold over 10 million albums in the United States.

Albums

Studio albums

Collaborative albums

Live albums

Video albums

Extended plays

Singles

As lead artist

As featured artist

Promotional singles

Other charted songs

Guest appearances

Production discography

Notes

References

External links
 Official website
 John Legend at AllMusic
 
 

Discographies of American artists
Rhythm and blues discographies
Discography